Smoked cheese is any cheese that has been specially treated by smoke-curing. It typically has a yellowish-brown outer pellicle which is a result of this curing process.

Process
Smoke-curing is typically done in one of two ways: cold-smoking and hot-smoking. The cold-smoking method (which can take up to a month, depending on the food) smokes the food at between 20° to 30° C (68° to 86° F). Hot-smoking partially or completely cooks the food by treating it at temperatures ranging from 40° to 90 °C (104° to 194° F).

Another method, typically used in less expensive cheeses, is to use artificial smoke flavoring to give the cheese a smoky flavoring and food coloring to give the outside the appearance of having been smoked in the more traditional manner.

Common smoked cheeses
Some smoked cheeses commonly produced and sold include smoked Gruyère, smoked Gouda (rookkaas), Provolone, Rauchkäse, Scamorza, Sulguni, Oscypek, Fynsk rygeost, and smoked Cheddar.

Gallery

See also

 List of smoked foods

References

Further reading

Juliet Harbutt. World Cheese Book. Penguin, Oct 5, 2009 pg .23